Exuma is a district of the Bahamas.

Exuma may also refer to:

 Exuma (musician) (1942–1997), Bahamian musician, artist, and playwright
 Exuma (album), 1970
 Exuma International Airport, Great Exuma, Bahamas
 Exuma Sound, in the Bahama Islands

See also
 
 Exum (disambiguation)